The Lonely Island is an American comedy and music group.

Lonely Island may also refer to:
"Lonely Island" (Sam Cooke song), 1958
"Lonely Island" (The Parliaments song), 1960
Lonely Island (film), a 2014 film
Uyedineniya Island, an island in northern Russia
Ensomheden, an island in Greenland